The 1996 French motorcycle Grand Prix was the sixth round of the 1996 Grand Prix motorcycle racing season. It took place on 9 June 1996 at Circuit Paul Ricard.

500 cc classification

250 cc classification

125 cc classification

References

French motorcycle Grand Prix
French
Motorcycle Grand Prix